The following is a timeline of the history of the city of San Sebastián, Spain.

Prior to 20th century

 1682 - Consulate of the Sea established.
 1813
 Siege of San Sebastián.
 31 August: Fire destroys large part of city.
 1817 -  constructed.
 1832 -  (town hall) built.
 1842 - Population: 10,036.
 1843 -  (theatre) opens.
 1863 - City walls dismantled.
 1872 -  newspaper begins publication.
 1874 -  established.
 1879 -  founded.
 1880
 Escuela de Artes y Oficios de San Sebastián (school) opens.
  magazine begins publication.
  (garden) established.
 1886
  established.
 Spanish royal court begins summering at San Sebastian.
 1887 -  built.
 1893 - Miramar Palace built.
 1897
 Cathedral of the Good Shepherd consecrated.
 Orfeón Donostiarra (musical group) formed.
  newspaper begins publication.
  (church) built in the  barrio.
 1900 - Population: 37,812.

20th century

 1902 - San Telmo Museoa (museum) established.
 1903 -  newspaper begins publication.
 1905 - María Cristina Bridge built.
 1909 - Real Sociedad football club formed.
 1912
  (theatre) opens.
  built.
 Igueldo funicular begins operating.
  beach resort established.
 1913 - Atotxa Stadium opens.
 1916 -  (racecourse) built.
 1920
 Los Justicieros anarchist group active.
 Population: 61,774.
 1926 -  established.
 1929 -  constructed.
 1930 - 17 August: Pact of San Sebastián signed.
 1934 - El Diario Vasco newspaper begins publication.
 1936 - July: Siege of Cuartel de Loyola at start of the Spanish Civil War.
 1938 - Gros fronton (sport venue) opens.
 1940 - Population: 103,979.
 1949 - Roman Catholic Diocese of San Sebastián established.
 1953 - San Sebastián International Film Festival begins.
 1960 - Population: 135,149.
 1965 - Velódromo de Anoeta opens.
 1970 - Population: 165,829.
 1990 -  established.
 1993 - Anoeta Stadium opens.
 1999 - Kursaal Congress Centre and Auditorium opens.

21st century

 2001 - Musikene music school founded.
 2003 - City divided into 17 barrios.(es)
 2008 - Population: 183,308 city; 405,099 metro.
 2011
  (church) built in  barrio.
 Basque Culinary Center campus opens.
 Population: 185,512.
 2015 - Eneko Goia elected mayor.(es)
 2018 - 10 June: Pro-independence, 202 kilometer human chain formed between cities of San Sebastián, Bilbao, and Vitoria-Gasteiz.

See also
 San Sebastián history
 

Other cities in the autonomous community of the Basque Country:(es)
 Timeline of Bilbao

References

This article incorporates information from the Spanish Wikipedia and Basque Wikipedia.

Bibliography

External links

San Sebastián
San Sebastian